Cnemidophorus flavissimus is a species of teiid lizard found on Islas Los Frailes in Venezuela.

References

flavissimus
Reptiles described in 2010
Taxa named by Gabriel N. Ugueto
Taxa named by Michael B. Harvey
Taxa named by Gilson Rivas
Reptiles of Venezuela